Dhindsa is a surname of Jat people. Dhindsa or Dhinsa or Dhinds or Dhindas is Jat Clan (Gotra) found in Punjab, India and Pakistan.

The Dhindsa (literally "skillful/wise ones") is one of the five major Jat Clan. 

Dhindsa is a Jat clan known for bravery and wisdom.

People
Notable persons with that name include:

 Hardyal Dhindsa, English politician
 Parminder Singh Dhindsa (born 1973), Indian politician
 Satsimranjit Dhindsa (born 1991), Canadian cricketer
 Sukhdev Singh Dhindsa (born 1936), Indian politician
 Sunny Dhinsa (born 1993), WWE wrestler ring name Akam

See also
 Dhinsa

References

Lists of people by surname